PyAOP ((7-Azabenzotriazol-1-yloxy)tripyrrolidinophosphonium hexafluorophosphate) is a coupling reagent used in solid phase peptide synthesis. It is a derivative of the HOAt family of coupling reagents. It is preferred over HATU, because it does not side react at the N-terminus of the peptide. Compared to the HOBt derivates, PyAOP (and HOAt in general) are more reactive due to the additional nitrogen.

See also
 HOAt reagent
 HOBt reagent
 BOP reagent
 PyBOP

References

Hexafluorophosphates
Peptide coupling reagents
Triazolopyridines
Reagents for biochemistry
Quaternary phosphonium compounds